Acanthopygus is a genus of beetles belonging to the family Anthribidae.

Species:

Acanthopygus albopunctatus 
Acanthopygus cinctus 
Acanthopygus griseus 
Acanthopygus metallicus 
Acanthopygus rubricollis 
Acanthopygus uniformis

References

Anthribidae